62nd National Board of Review Awards

Best Picture: 
 Dances with Wolves 
The 62nd National Board of Review Awards, honoring the best in filmmaking in 1990, were announced on 16 December 1990 and given on 4 March 1991.

Top 10 films
Dances with Wolves
Hamlet
Goodfellas
Awakenings
Reversal of Fortune
Miller's Crossing
Metropolitan
Mr. and Mrs. Bridge
Avalon
The Grifters

Top Foreign Films
Cyrano de Bergerac
Jesus of Montreal
The Nasty Girl
Monsieur Hire
Tie Me Up! Tie Me Down!

Winners
Best Picture: 
Dances with Wolves
Best Foreign Language Film:
Cyrano de Bergerac, France
Best Actor:
Robert De Niro and Robin Williams - Awakenings 
Best Actress:
Mia Farrow - Alice 
Best Supporting Actor:
Joe Pesci - Goodfellas
Best Supporting Actress:
Winona Ryder - Mermaids 
Best Director:
Kevin Costner - Dances with Wolves
Career Achievement Award
James Stewart

External links
National Board of Review of Motion Pictures :: Awards for 1990

1990
1990 film awards
1990 in American cinema